Clipston is a village and civil parish that is administered as part of West Northamptonshire in England. The population of the civil parish at the 2011 census was 643. At the time of the 2001 census, the parish had a population of 613 people.

Buildings and facilities

All Saints Church is a Grade I listed building, dating from the early 13th century. There are many 17th and 18th century monuments to the Buswell family of London merchants.

The Baptist Chapel of 1803 has a front by Edmund Francis Law of 1864.

To the west of the church is Clipston Primary School. The school was previously used as a hospital and dates back to 1667–73. The school celebrated its 350th birthday in 2017. A distinctive feature of the school is its one handed clock that appears at the front of the building.

Clipston has a pub The Bull's Head.

There is a village hall and a green.

Between 1859 and 1960 the village was served by Clipston and Oxendon railway station about 3 miles north-east of the village and running trains between Northampton in the south and Market Harborough in the north.

References

External links 

 http://www.clipston.org/

Villages in Northamptonshire
West Northamptonshire District
Civil parishes in Northamptonshire